The Curtiss/Curtiss-Robertson Model 56 Thrush was a 1929 six passenger high-wing fixed undercarriage single-engine cabin monoplane  airliner and utility transport powered by either a Curtiss Challenger or a Wright Whirlwind radial engine and built as an enlargement of the earlier Curtiss Robin. Several were used for record breaking endurance flights by female pilots during the early 1930s including one in which the aircraft stayed aloft for almost ten days.

Design and development

Three  Curtiss Challenger-engined Curtiss Thrush prototypes (serialled G-1 to G-3) were built at Curtiss' Garden City factory, but these were underpowered and production examples, redesignated Thrush J (serialled 1001 to 1010) with  Wright Whirlwind engines, were built at the Curtiss-Robertson St Louis factory. All three prototypes were later re-engined with Whirlwinds to make them Thrush Js. 
The fuselage of the Thrush formed the basis for the twin-engine Curtiss Kingbird which was developed roughly in parallel.

The fuselage was built up as a Pratt truss frame formed mainly from Duraluminum tubing and fittings with welded Chrome-moly tubing reinforcing highly stressed areas and covered in fabric.
The wing was a fabric covered semi-cantilever braced with steel tube struts, and had solid spruce spars and stamped Alclad ribs with Alclad sheet wrapped over leading edge. A fuel tank is mounted within each wing near the root. Rudder and elevators were welded chrome-moly steel tubing. 116" track undercarriage is fitted with oleo-pneumatic shock obsorbers and Bendix brakes, and is braced to the front struts and lower longerons.

Operational history
Twelve examples were ordered by China National Aviation Corporation (CNAC) but only ten production examples were built. All but one was then registered in the US, as many aircraft exported to the CNAC were, however only one example made it to China, which it did in 1930, and it may not have entered CNAC service. One of the ten was lost on its first flight (serial 1006) and its registration was transferred to the next aircraft built.
One of the prototypes went to Venezuela to a private individual, and a production example went to Cuba where it was the first aircraft operated by the Compañía Nacional Cubana de Aviación Curtiss (CNCAC), forerunner of Cubana de Aviación, Cuba's national airline.

From the 14th to the 22nd of August 1932, Louise Thaden & Frances Marsalis flew prototype Thrush J NC9142 "I.J. Fox" (named for their sponsor, a fur coat company and nicknamed the "Flying Boudoir" by the press) for 196 hours 5 minutes, refuelling in flight from a Curtiss Robin to set an endurance record near Valley Stream, New York. For this and other record-breaking flights, Thaden received the Harmon Trophy in 1936.
Helen Richey and Frances Marsalis flew production Thrush J NC7568 "Outdoor Girl" (named for a brand of women's cosmetics, a new sponsor) for 237 hours, 42 minutes (nearly ten days) from the 20th to the 30th of December 1933 over Miami, Florida. Like the first flight, it too was refuelled from the air from a Curtiss Robin.
Jean LaRene and Mary Elizabeth Owens made five attempts at the world's endurance record at the Curtiss-Reynolds Airport in August during the 1934 Chicago World's Fair in Curtiss Thrush J NR581N "Lone Star" Jean LaRene made another attempt in NR581N on the record with Henrietta Sumner from 8 December to 30 November 1934 over Oklahoma City but experienced engine problems and was forced down after 198 hours and 13 minutes aloft.

Two examples found their way to Alaska where they were used as bush planes, one by Ralph Savory before he joined Star Air Service, and a second was flown in Alaska by Gordon MacKenzie.
The remainder were used in the United States by various operators as air taxis and feeder airliners.

Operators
 Compañía Nacional Cubana de Aviación Curtiss (CNCAC) - one example registered NM-3.
  unknown operator(s) - one example, unknown registration.
 various operators.

Variants
Thrush (ATC 159 & 160) - prototypes powered by 170 hp Curtiss Challenger, three built, all converted to Thrush J (ATC 236).
Thrush J (ATC 261) - main production variant with 225 hp Wright J-6-7 Whirlwind, 10 built.
Thrush Special - one converted from a Thrush J with 240 hp Wright J-6-7 Whirlwind. and a second converted with Wright J-5.

Specifications (Thrush J - ATC 261)

See also

References

Notes

Citations

Bibliography

Aerofiles.com Curtiss K through Z created: 24 January 2009 accessdate:May 2014

Golden Years of Aviation accessdate:May 2014
 

Thrush
1920s United States airliners
1920s United States civil utility aircraft
Single-engined tractor aircraft
High-wing aircraft
Aircraft first flown in 1929